Sándor Holczreiter (18 July 1946 in Füzesabony – 14 December 1999 in Tatabánya) was a Hungarian weightlifter who competed in the 1972 Summer Olympics.

References

1946 births
1999 deaths
Hungarian male weightlifters
Olympic weightlifters of Hungary
Weightlifters at the 1972 Summer Olympics
Olympic bronze medalists for Hungary
Olympic medalists in weightlifting
Sportspeople from Heves County
Medalists at the 1972 Summer Olympics
20th-century Hungarian people